Cha-241 or No. 241 (Japanese: 第二百四十一號驅潜特務艇) was a No.1-class auxiliary submarine chaser of the Imperial Japanese Navy that served during World War II.

History
She was laid down on 1 April 1944 at the Yokosuka shipyard of Koyanagi Shipyard Co., Ltd. (株式會社小柳造船所) and launched on 19 September 1944. She was completed and commissioned on 22 October 1944; fitted with armaments at the Yokosuka Naval Arsenal; and assigned to the Kii Defense Force, Osaka Guard District under Ensign Koji Matsumoto. Cha-241 survived the war. 

On 1 December 1945, she was demobilized and enrolled as a minesweeper by the occupation forces. On 1 January 1947, she was assigned to the Japan Maritime Safety Agency and on 20 August 1948 she was designated a minesweeper (MS-04). On 1 December 1951, she was renamed Furutaka (ふるたか).  On 1 April 1956, she was transferred to the newly created Japan Maritime Self-Defense Force. She was delisted on 31 March 1962.

References

1944 ships
No.1-class auxiliary submarine chasers
Auxiliary ships of the Imperial Japanese Navy